Herpetogramma pallidalis is a moth in the family Crambidae. It was described by George Hampson in 1913. It is found in Indonesia (Tanimbar Islands), Cameroon, Ghana, Nigeria, South Africa and Uganda.

References

Moths described in 1913
Herpetogramma
Moths of Indonesia
Moths of Africa